American rock duo Best Coast has released four studio albums, two live albums, seven extended plays, 24 singles, and 15 music videos. Formed in Los Angeles in 2009, the band consists of singer, songwriter, and guitarist Bethany Cosentino and multi-instrumentalist Bobb Bruno.

Albums

Studio albums

Live albums

Extended plays

Singles

Split singles

Guest appearances

Music videos

Notes

References

External links
 
 
 
 

Alternative rock discographies
Discographies of American artists
Rock music group discographies